Paraclete is a Christian biblical term occurring five times in the Johannine texts of the New Testament. In Christian theology, the word commonly refers to the Holy Spirit and is translated as 'advocate', 'counsellor or 'helper'.

Etymology 
The English term Paraclete comes from the Koine Greek word . René Kieffer further explains the development of the meaning of this term:

The word  is a verbal adjective, often used of one called to help in a lawcourt. In the Jewish tradition the word was transcribed with Hebrew letters and used for angels, prophets, and the just as advocates before God's court. The word also acquired the meaning of 'one who consoles' (cf. Job 16:2, Theodotion's and Aquila's translations; the LXX has the correct word ). It is probably wrong to explain the Johannine  on the basis of only one religious background. The word is filled with a complex meaning: the Spirit replaces Jesus, is an advocate and a witness, but also consoles the disciples.

Latin etymological precedent 
Lochlan Shelfer suggests that the Greek term paraclete is a translation of the preceding Latin term :
" [does not have] any independent meaning of its own, it is in fact a calque for the Latin term  meaning a person of high social standing who speaks on behalf of a defendant in a court of law before a judge. When Greeks came into contact with the Roman Empire during the late Republic, the word  was developed as a precise equivalent to the Latin legal term . Thus, its significance must be found not only in its very few extant appearances, but also in the specific use of the Latin legal term."

In Classical Greek 
The term is not common in non-Jewish texts. The best known use is by Demosthenes:

A Greek–English Lexicon, apart from Demosthenes (above) cites also the example of a slave summoned as a help.

In Judaism 
Philo speaks several times of "paraclete" advocates primarily in the sense of human intercessors.

The word later went from Hellenistic Jewish writing into rabbinic literature.

In Christianity
In the Christian New Testament, paraclete appears only in the Johannine texts, and it is used only on five occasions: Gospel of John 14:16, 14:26, 15:26, 16:7, and First Epistle of John chapter 2, verse 1. 

As a result of the immediate explanation in John 14:17, the Paraclete in John 14:16 is considered to be the Holy Sprit.

The New Testament Studies, a peer-reviewed academic journal published by Cambridge University Press, describes a "striking similarity" between the defined attributes of what the Paraclete is, and is to do, and what the outcome of Christian prophecy has spoken to, explaining the Paraclete as the post-Passover gift of the Holy Spirit. "The Paraclete represents the Spirit as manifested in a particular way, as a pneumatic Christian speech charisma. Every verb describing the ministry of the Paraclete is directly related to his speech function."

The early church identified  the Paraclete as the Holy Spirit. In first-century Jewish and Christian understanding, the presence of the Holy Spirit is to claim the rebirth of prophecy.

During his period as a hermit in the mid-12th century, Peter Abelard dedicated his chapel to the Paraclete because "I had come there as a fugitive and, in the depths of my despair, was granted some comfort by the grace of God."

Today, the Holy Spirit continues to be referred to as the Paraclete in a prayer known as the Divine Praises, recited during Benediction of the Blessed Sacrament.

Scholarly interpretations 
 quotes Jesus as saying "another Paraclete" will come to help his disciples, implying, according to Lawrence Lutkemeyer, that Jesus is the first and primary Paraclete. In  Jesus himself is called "paraclete".

Raymond Brown (1970), supported by George Johnston (2005), also says that the "another Paraclete" of John 14:16 is in many ways another Jesus, the presence of Jesus after Jesus ascends to his Father.

The Gospel of Matthew twice uses the passive form of the corresponding verb , in 2:18 and 5:4. In both instances, the context is of mourning, and the meaning of the verb is 'to be comforted'.

Paraclete first appearing in gospel
Here is the context of the passage in John 14:15-27 with the translation of Paraclete as Advocate shown in bold:

In Islam 

Many Muslim writers have argued that "another Paraclete" (John 14:16)—the first being Jesus—refers to Muhammad. This claim is based on Quran 61:6. 

There are currently no known Greek manuscripts with this reading (all extant Greek manuscripts read  ), although the earliest manuscript evidence available is from the 3rd century.

Regarding what the original Greek term was, according to A. Guthrie and E. F. F. Bishop:

Sean Anthony agrees that the connection of Ahmad to the Paraclete in the Gospel of John may have been a later tradition that is not found in the work of Ibn Ishaq and that the earliest extant attempts by Muslims to connect these two figures that inspire later discussion on the subject goes back to Ibn Hisham and Ibn Qutaybah.

A later interpolation of this passage to the Quran has been rejected in modern Islamic studies. This has been supported by the fact that the earliest as well as the later manuscripts of the Quran contain the same passage and wording in Surah 61.

Historical development
In Łewond's version of the correspondence between the Byzantine emperor Leo III and the Umayyad caliph Umar II, a letter is attributed to Leo:
By the 8th-century, the identification of the Paraclete with Muhammad was already a known concept. Evidence shows that the Abbasid caliph al-Mahdi debated the concept with the influential Christian patriarch Timothy I (d. 823). The Persian theologian Ali al-Tabari (d. 870) believed that only Muhammad could have been the Paraclete since he taught people what they previously didn't knew. The Syrian scholar al-Dimashqi (d. 1327) asserts that the verses were generally believed to be about the coming of a prophet, until the reign of Constantine I when the Christian priests altered the verses to refer to the Holy Spirit, fearing that Constantine would recognize the true faith.

See also 
 Ahmad
 Congregation of the Servants of the Paraclete
 Cult of the Holy Spirit
 Holy Spirit in Islam
 Rūḥ
 Montanism

References

Bibliography

External links 

 Catholic Encyclopedia: Paraclete
 Jewish Encyclopedia: Paraclete

Christian terminology
Christianity and Islam
Names of God in Christianity
New Testament Greek words and phrases
New Testament theology
Pneumatology
Sayings of Jesus